Munabbih ibn Kamil ibn Sirajud-Din Dhee Kibaar Abu-Abdullah al-Yamani al-San'ani was a companion of Muhammad.

He  been converted to Islam in the lifetime of Muhammad.

He was a Persian knight , and was married to a Himyarite.

He had two children, Wahb ibn Munabbih and Hammam ibn Munabbih.

He came from Herat, Khorasan to Yemen.

See also

List of non-Arab Sahaba
Sunni view of the Sahaba
Al-Abna'

References

Year of birth missing
Year of death missing
7th-century Iranian people
Companions of the Prophet
Yemenite people of Iranian descent